Woolwich Dock is a former dry dock and shipyard in Woolwich, Sydney, New South Wales, Australia. The site was purchased by Morts Dock and Engineering Company in 1898.

Several extensions were carried out between 1902 and 1918, and the dock was lengthened to 260 metres. To achieve this William Street was acquired and a new road constructed – Franki Avenue, named after the general manager and later managing director of the company, James Peter Franki.

By 1917 the company employed over 1,500 people.

In the 1940s the Atlas workshops were replaced by the sawtooth roofed building which still stands on the site and several brick buildings were added. The busiest times for Woolwich Dock were during the two world wars when many passenger vessels were converted to armed troopships and repairs were carried out on damaged ships.

After the Second World War work declined and the dock was closed down in 1958 and  until 1963 the dock was vacant.

1963–1997: Army Occupation

The Australian Army purchased it in 1963 for its water transport operations. The three oldest buildings on the site were demolished and the Army erected a number of metal prefabricated buildings, added timber fender piers and timber wharves to the dock itself and constructed a traveling boat crane beside the dock.

They made use of the dock for launching craft and the workshops for repairs and maintenance.

The Army units based at Woolwich were relocated to Townsville, Queensland, in 1997.

1997 Onwards

In the late 1990s it was proposed that the land be sold to developers. A community group, Foreshore 2000 Woolwich, was formed to protest against sale of the site and through the lobbying efforts of this group and the local council, the Australian Government agreed to the site being returned to the people of Sydney. In 2001 the Sydney Harbour Federation Trust  was formed to administer Woolwich Dock and various other sites around Sydney Harbour.

Ferns 

The sandstone cliffs near the head of the dock area have a notable population of ferns. Coral ferns (Gleichenia species) and king fern are prominent. Three locally uncommon species have been recorded on the sandstone cliffs beside the walking path; fork fern (Tmesipteris truncata), scrambling clubmoss (Lycopodium cernuum) and the skeleton fork fern (Psilotum nudum).

Citations

External links

 http://www.harbourtrust.gov.au/visit/woolwich-dock-parklands
 http://www.takver.com/history/myunion/myunionp08.htm
 http://www.woolwichdock.com/index.html

1901 establishments in Australia
Commonwealth Heritage List places in New South Wales
Transport infrastructure completed in 1901
Shipyards of New South Wales
Woolwich, New South Wales